Walk, Don't Run is a 1966 American comedy film directed by Charles Walters, and starring Cary Grant (in his final film role), Samantha Eggar and Jim Hutton. The film is set during the 1964 Summer Olympics in Tokyo and is a remake of the 1943 film The More the Merrier. The title stems from the basic rule of racewalking: that competitors must not run at any point (both feet leaving the ground).

Plot
In 1964, important British businessman Sir William Rutland arrives two days early in Tokyo and encounters a housing shortage caused by the 1964 Summer Olympics. While at the British Embassy seeking help, he spots an advertisement for a roommate and soon finds himself at the residence of Christine Easton, who insists it would be improper to take him in as a housemate. Easton had forgotten to advertise that she wanted to sublet to a woman, but eventually, lets Rutland stay. 

Rutland sublets half of his space to American Olympic competitor Steve Davis, without consulting Easton. While Easton is less than thrilled with the arrangement, she has to put up with it, as she has already spent Rutland's share of the rent. Rutland sets about playing matchmaker for the two young people, in spite of their disparate personalities and Easton's engagement to a boringly dependable British diplomat, Julius D. Haversack.

Davis repeatedly dodges questions about his Olympic sport. Rutland meddles in the young couple's romantic troubles. To further his matchmaking, he even strips down to his boxer shorts and a T-shirt so he can pretend to be a competitor and talk to Davis during his event, the 50-kilometre walk, and eventually heals the breach between the young lovers.

Cast

 Cary Grant as Sir William Rutland 
 Samantha Eggar as Christine Easton 
 Jim Hutton as Steve Davis 
 John Standing as Julius P. Haversack 
 Miiko Taka as Aiko Kurawa 
 Ted Hartley as Yuri Andreyovitch 
 Ben Astar as Dimitri 
 George Takei as Police Captain 
 Teru Shimada as Mr. Kurawa 
 Terry Farnsworth as Olympic walker
 Lois Kiuchi as Mrs. Kurawa

Production 
Filming locations were at the Hotel Okura Tokyo, Embassy of the United Kingdom, Tokyo, and Yoyogi National Gymnasium.

Grant retired from acting to focus on raising his daughter. He died in 1986.

Score 

The film's music was composed by Quincy Jones, with Peggy Lee contributing to the writing of the songs, "Stay with Me" and "Happy Feet".

Personnel

Quincy Jones – composer, conductor
Toots Thielemans – harmonica, whistles
Harry "Sweets" Edison – trumpet
Bud Shank – reeds
Earl Palmer – drums
Carol Kaye – electric bass
Emil Richards – percussion
Don Elliot Voices – vocals on "Happy Feet"
Tony Clementi – vocals on "Stay with Me"
Jack Hayes, Leo Shuken – orchestrations
Richard Hazard – vocal orchestrations

Reception
The film grossed $7,500,000 at the box office, earning $4.5 million in US theatrical rentals. It was the 22nd highest grossing film of 1966.

See also
List of American films of 1966

References

Bibliography
 Reid, John Howard. "Walk, Don't Run." Reid's Film Index, no. 36 (1998): 178–181.

External links
 
 
 
 
 Historic reviews, photo gallery at CaryGrant.net

1966 films
American romantic comedy films
1966 romantic comedy films
1960s sports comedy films
Remakes of American films
Films scored by Quincy Jones
Films directed by Charles Walters
Films about the 1964 Summer Olympics
Films about Olympic track and field
Films set in Tokyo
Films set in 1964
Columbia Pictures films
Films produced by Sol C. Siegel
Japan in non-Japanese culture
1960s English-language films
1960s American films